Blaster Master is a video game released by Sunsoft for the Nintendo Entertainment System.

Blaster Master may also refer to:

Blaster Master Jr., also known as Blaster Master Boy in North America, 1991 Game Boy video game
Blaster Master 2, sequel to Blaster Master, released on the Sega Genesis
Blaster Master: Enemy Below, 2000 Game Boy Color video game, fourth release in the Blaster Master series
Blaster Master: Blasting Again, 2000 PlayStation game
Blaster Master: Overdrive, 2010 WiiWare game
Blaster Master Zero, 2017 video game
Blaster Master Zero 2 2019 video game
 Blaster Master Zero 3 2021 video game

See also
 Master Blaster (disambiguation)
 Master Blasters
 Raster Blaster
  Gaster Blaster